() is an Arabic word meaning "community". Thus, it can be said to be a supra-national community with a common history.

In the Quran the ummah typically refers to a single group that shares common religious beliefs, specifically those that are the objects of a divine plan of salvation. In the context of pan-Islamism and politics, the word  can be used to mean the concept of a Commonwealth of the Muslim Believers.

General usage
The word ummah (pl. umam) means nation in Arabic. For example, the Arabic term for the United Nations is الأمم المتحدة Al-Umam Al-Mutahedah, and the term الأمة العربية Al-Ummah Al-Arabeyah is used to refer to "the Arab Nation".

The word ummah differs from the concept of a country or people. In its greater context it is used to describe a larger group of people. For example, in Arabic the word شعب sha'ab ("people") would be used to describe the citizens of Turkey. However, the term ummah is used to describe the Turkic peoples as a whole, which includes Turkey as well as the entire Turkish diaspora.

Islamic usage and origin
The phrase  in the Quran ("One Nation") refers to all the Islamic world as it existed at the time. The Quran says: "You [Muslims] are the best nation brought out for Mankind, commanding what is righteous (lit. "recognized [as good]") and forbidding what is wrong (lit. "recognized [as evil]")" [3:110].

The usage is further clarified by the Constitution of Medina, an early document said to have been negotiated by Muhammad in CE 622 with the leading clans of Medina, which explicitly refers to Jewish, Christians 

Emergence

At the time of Muhammad, before the conception of the ummah, Arab communities were typically governed by kinship. In other words, the political ideology of the Arabs centred on tribal affiliations and blood-relations. In the midst of a tribal society, the religion of Islam emerged and along with it the concept of the ummah. The ummah emerged according to the idea that a messenger or prophet has been sent to a community. Unlike earlier messengers, who had been sent to various communities in the past (as can be found among the Prophets in the Old Testament), Muhammad sought to develop an ummah that was universal and not only for Arabs. Muhammad saw his purpose as the transmission of a divine message and the leadership of the Islamic community. Islam sees Muhammad as the messenger to the ummah, transmitting a divine message, and implying that God is directing the life affairs of the ummah. Accordingly, the purpose of the ummah was to be based on religion by following the commands of God, rather than kinship. 

Immediately after Muhammad's death in 632, Caliphates were established and the Shia emerged. Caliphates were Islamic states under the leadership of a political successor to the Islamic prophet Muhammad. These polities developed into multi-ethnic trans-national empires.

Qur'an

There are 62 instances in which the term ummah is mentioned in the Qur'an, and they almost always refer to ethical, linguistic, or religious bodies of people who are subject to the divine plan of salvation. The meaning of the term appears to transform throughout the chronology of the Qur'an. When it is first used in the Qur'an, it is hardly distinguishable from the term qawm, which can be translated to 'people'. The Qur'an recognizes that each ummah has a messenger that has been sent to relay a divine message to the community and that all ummahs await God's ultimate judgment. Although the meaning of the ummah begins simply with a general application of the word, it gradually develops to reference a general religious community and then evolves to specifically refer to the Muslim community. Before it referred exclusively to Muslims, the ummah encompassed Jewish and Christian communities as one with the Muslims and referred to them as the People of the Book. That is supplemented by the Constitution of Medina which declares all members of the ummah, regardless of religion, to be of "one ummah". In those passages of the Qur'an, ummah may be referring to a unity of mankind through the shared beliefs of the monotheistic religions. However, Denny points out that the most recent ummah that receives a messenger from God is the Arab ummah. As the Muslims became stronger during their residence in Medina, the Arab ummah narrowed into an ummah exclusively for Muslims. That is evidenced by the resacralisation of the Kaaba and Muhammad's command to take a pilgrimage to Mecca, along with the redirection of prayer from Jerusalem to Mecca. The period in which the term is used most often is within the Third Meccan Period, followed by the Medinian Period. The extensive use of the term during both time periods indicates that Muhammad had begun to arrive at the concept of the ummah to specify the genuine Muslim community. Furthermore, the early Meccan passages generally equate ummah as religion, but in the Medinan passages refer more specifically to the relations of ummah and religion. The final passage that refers to ummah in the Qur'an refers to the Muslims as the "best community" and accordingly led to it being as an exclusive reference to Islam.

A verse in the Qur'an also mentions the ummah in the context of all of the messengers and that their ummah (nation) of theirs is one, and God is their Lord entirely:

Mecca
Initially it did not appear that the new Muslim community would oppose the tribes that already existed in Mecca. The first Muslims did not need to make a break with traditional Quraysh customs since the vision for the new community included moral norms that were not unfamiliar to the tribal society of Mecca. However, what distinguished this community from the tribes was its focus of the place of those morals within a person's life.

Medina
After Muhammad and the first converts to Islam were forced to leave Mecca, the community was welcomed in Medina by the Ansar, a group of Pagans who had converted to Islam. Despite Medina already being occupied by numerous Jewish and polytheistic tribes, the arrival of Muhammad and his followers provoked no opposition from Medina's residents. Upon arriving in Medina, Muhammad established the Constitution of Medina with the various tribal leaders in order to form the Meccan immigrants and the Medinan residents into a single community, the ummah. Rather than limiting members of the ummah to a single tribe or religious affiliation as had been the case when the ummah first developed in Mecca, the Constitution of Medina ensured that the ummah was composed of a variety of people and beliefs essentially making it to be supra-tribal. Islamic historian, Tabari, suggested that Muhammad's initial intentions upon arriving in Medina was to establish a mosque, however this is unlikely. Tabari also claimed that Muhammad observed the first Friday prayer in Medina. It occurred on Friday because Friday served as a market day in Medina to enable Jews to observe the sabbath. Membership to the ummah was not restricted to adhering to the Muslim faith but rather encompassed all of the tribes as long as they vowed to recognize Muhammad as the community and political figure of authority. The Constitution of Medina declared that the Jewish tribes and the Muslims from Medina formed 'one ummah.'  It is possible that the Medinan ummah was purely secular (compared to the later transformation of the ummah in Mecca) due to its variety of beliefs and practices of its members. The purpose of the Constitution of Medina was to uphold political obligations and social relations between the various tribes. The community members in Medina, although not derived from the same faith, were committed to each other through a desire to defend the common good of the community. In other words, the community was united according to preserve its shared interests. The people of other religious beliefs, particularly those that are considered to be "People of the Book" were granted the special protection of God through the dhimmah contract. These other religious groups were guaranteed security by God and Muhammad because of their common religious history as being the "People of the Book." The dhimmah served as a sort of alliance between Muslims and non-Muslims. In the earlier treaties of the dhimmah, both groups were viewed as equal in status and both were obligated to help the other. However, in later treaties, after Islam had gained more power throughout Arabia, the dhimmah was perceived as the fulfilment of the religious duties of Muslims along with the payment of zakat. With the new contract of dhimmah, non-Muslims' protection by God and Muhammad became dependent on their payment.

Constitution of Medina
The Constitution of Medina is a document created by Muhammad to regulate social and political life in Medina. It deals with various tribal issues such as the organization and leadership of the participating tribal groups, warfare, blood money, ransom of captives, and war expenditures. It is at the beginning of the document that the Muslims from the  Quraysh (those from Mecca) and the Muslims from Yathrib (those from Medina) are declared to be an ummah or one community. The word ummah appears again when the document refers to the treaty of the Jews and states that the Yahūd Banī ' Awf, or Jews, are an ummah that exists alongside the ummah of the Muslims or may be included in the same ummah as the Muslims. The document does state that the Jews who join the Muslims will receive aid and equal rights. In addition, the Jews will be guaranteed security from the Muslims, and are granted to maintain their own religion just as the Muslims will maintain theirs. This implies that the ummah is not strictly a religious community in Medina. The Constitution of Medina lists the various Medinan tribes derived from the Aws and Khazraj as well as the several Jewish tribes that are granted to keep their tribal organization and leadership. The document also reveals that each group, the Muslims and the Jews, is responsible for its own finances except during time of war, when the two are able to share expenses.

Back to Mecca
After the Muslim takeover of Mecca, membership in the ummah required a commitment to Islam. This happened as a result of Islam beginning to distinguish itself not just from Paganism but also Judaism and Christianity by emphasizing a model of community based on Abraham. The membership of the ummah was now based on two main principles; the first is to worship God alone and secondly, in order to worship God properly one must be in a guided community.

The essentials of the new society were the new relations between human beings and God and between human beings and one another. The society was held together by the Prophet. Feuding among Muslim clans was forbidden. Muhammad's community was designed to transform the world itself through action in the world.

See also

 Caliphate
 Constitution of Medina
 Divisions of the world in Islam
 Islamic missionary activity
 Kafir
 List of countries by Muslim population
 Muslim population growth
 Muslim world
 Organisation of Islamic Cooperation
 Pan-Islamism

References

External links
 The definition of 'Ummah' is the unity of the Muslims
 Online Islamic Learning Resource

Arabic words and phrases in Sharia
Pan-Islamism
Islamic concepts of religious geography
Islamic terminology